Rockland is the third and final studio album by Norwegian band Katzenjammer. It was released on January 16, 2015 in Europe and on March 10, 2015 in North America. The album is named after Rockland County, New York.

Track listing

Personnel
Credits adapted from Rockland liner notes.

Katzenjammer
Anne Marit Bergheim – instruments, vocals
Solveig Heilo – instruments, vocals
Turid J. Honerud – instruments, vocals
Marianne Sveen – instruments, vocals

Additional musicians
Amund Maarud – guitar on "Old de Spain" and "Curvaceous Needs"
Jørgen Nordby – drums on "Rockland"

References

2015 albums
Katzenjammer (band) albums
Pop rock albums by Norwegian artists